Dengate is a surname. Notable people with the surname include:

John Dengate (1938–2013), Australian folk singer and songwriter
Peter Dengate Thrush (born 1956), aka "PDT", New Zealand barrister specialising in Internet law